Idalino Monges (born 5 June 1940) is a Paraguayan footballer. He played in 17 matches for the Paraguay national football team from 1963 and 1971. He was also part of Paraguay's squad for the 1959 South American Championship that took place in Ecuador.

References

External links
 
 

1940 births
Living people
Paraguayan footballers
Paraguay international footballers
Place of birth missing (living people)
Association football defenders
Cerro Porteño players
Club Atlético Independiente footballers
Club Olimpia footballers
Paraguayan expatriate footballers
Expatriate footballers in Argentina